Cameron Stallones, better known as Sun Araw, is an American musician. Previously a member of the band Magic Lantern, he has released several albums of experimental music, including a collaboration with Jamaican reggae group The Congos. He has also worked as part of the Not Not Fun label 'supergroup' Vibes.

Biography
Originally from Austin, Texas, Stallones now resides in Long Beach, California. Stallones was associated with the Not Not Fun label, and released his debut album, The Phynx, in 2008. This was followed later that year with Beach Head. He has been prolific since then with three albums released in 2010 and two in 2011. Stallones also collaborated with Pocahaunted on the Passage album.

Stallones set up his Sun Ark studio in his Long Beach home, where he records most of his music.

His 2012 collaboration with M. Geddes Gengras and The Congos Icon Give Thank reached number seven on the Billboard Top World Albums chart.
 Sun Araw and The Congos also performed live together.

Name 
Araw is a Tagalog word meaning sun or day, depending on context, so Stallones' stage name literally translates to sun sun. However, as Stallones recounted to LA Weekly, he considers his name to mean "sun day", which is a pun referring to Sunday, and more specifically the Christian Sabbath day. Therefore, Stallones considers his stage name to mean "sacred rest", despite "rest" not being one of the meanings of araw. One justification for this he provided was that he participates for a time in many bandsbut his one man show Sun Araw is something he can always rely on when he takes a break from other music projects.

Musical style
His 2010 album Off Duty was described by Allmusic writer Gregory Heaney as "pulsing, Krautrock-influenced retro-futuristic lo-fi." Jon Pareles, writing for The New York Times, described Sun Araw's music as "a happy jungle of electronic repetition and live playing. Loops and echoes reconfigured reggae, funk and Afrobeat in dizzying ways; the music cackled and hopped, ready to trip up dancers or just get trippy in decidedly 21st-century groove."

His style has been characterized as experimental, containing "sampled loops, echoed vocals, bursting bass, and random moments." His music has also been described as "neo-dub" and "psych-rock."

Discography

Albums
The Phynx (2008), Not Not Fun
Beach Head (2008), Not Not Fun
Heavy Deeds (2009), Not Not Fun
On Patrol (2010), Not Not Fun
Night Gallery (2011), Thrill Jockey - with Eternal Tapestry
Ancient Romans (2011), Sun Ark/Drag City
Icon Give Thank (2012), RVNG Intl - with M. Geddes Gingras and The Congos, released with the Icon Eye film in the FRKWYS series
The Inner Treaty (2012), Sun Ark/Drag City
Belomancie (2014), Sun Ark/Drag City
Gazebo Effect (2015), Sun Ark/Drag City
Music from Harvester (movie soundtrack) (2015), Sun Ark - with Nicholas Malkin
The Saddle of the Increate (2017), Sun Ark/Drag City
Guarda in alto (movie soundtrack) (2018), Goodfellas
Rock Sutra (2020), Sun Ark/Drag City

EPs
Boat Trip (2008), Woodsist
Leaves Like These (2009), Sun Ark
In Orbit (2009), Stunned Records - with Matthew Lessner
Off Duty (2010), Woodsist
Major Grotto (2010), Sun Ark

Singles
Sun Ark (2010), Not Not Fun
Houston Abstros (2011), Monofonus Press

In popular culture

 The tracks "Harken Sawshine", "Horse Steppin", as well as an original cover of Neil Young's "Thrasher" were featured in the 2011 independent feature film The Woods written and directed by Matthew Lessner.
 The tracks "Horse Steppin" and "Deep Cover" were featured in the 2012 video game Hotline Miami.
 Sun Araw stars in the 2013 short film Chapel Perilous, written and directed by Matthew Lessner, which won the Audience Award at the Sundance Film Festival.

References

External links

Living people
American experimental musicians
American reggae guitarists
American male guitarists
American rock guitarists
Neo-psychedelia
Musicians from Austin, Texas
Hypnagogic pop musicians
Guitarists from Texas
Year of birth missing (living people)